Michelle Danielle Collins (born 28 May 1962) is an English actress and TV presenter, best known for her roles in the British soap operas EastEnders and Coronation Street and the 1987 comedy film “Personal Services”, about a character based on brothel owner Cynthia Payne  

Collins played Cindy Beale in the BBC soap EastEnders from 1988 to 1998, with a two-year break between 1990 and 1992. She played Stella Price in the ITV soap Coronation Street from 2011 to 2014. Her other notable TV roles include the BBC dramas Real Women (1998–1999), Sunburn (1999–2000) and Two Thousand Acres of Sky (2001–2003).

Early life and education
Collins was born at Hackney South East Hospital in Hackney, east London, to a Welsh mother, Mary, and a father of English and Flemish heritage.  Her Flemish grandfather was Belgian from Antwerp and had emigrated to the UK in 1915 when aged five. She and her elder sister Vicki were brought up by their mother Mary in Highbury, London. When Collins was 14, her mother went back to university to obtain a law degree. In the 1970s Collins was a member of the youth organisation the Woodcraft Folk, and visited Romania with the group.

She trained at the Royal Court Activists and Cockpit Youth Theatre from the age of 14, and Kingsway Princeton College, where she studied drama and theatre at O/A-level.

Career

Singing
After her exams Collins landed a role in Mikhail Bulgakov's The Crimson Island, directed by Lou Stein, at the Gate Theatre. Her career changed direction after performing in the 1978 video for the Squeeze song "Cool For Cats". The band spent 18 months touring the country, working with artists such as Marc Almond, Level 42, Altered Images and Kid Creole and the Coconuts.

Early acting career
When the band broke up in 1982, she went back into acting and with the help of her friend, the British actor Tim Roth, she successfully gained a part in a musical with Gary Hutton and Gary Shail known as H.M.V. Collins had also been in The Illustrated Mum by Jacqueline Wilson.

Collins's first TV appearance was with Gary Oldman in the BBC drama Morgan's Boy. Other TV credits included: two series of the sitcom Running Wild, where she played Ray Brooks daughter; a part in ITV drama The Bill; a Screen Two production Lucky Sunil, directed by Michael Caton Jones and a BBC play Pressures. She later appeared in three films: Personal Services, Empire State and Stephen Poliakoff's Hidden City. Collins appeared in an episode of the BBC's Bergerac (series 4) in 1985.

EastEnders

While she was filming the BBC play Pressures in 1988, Collins was spotted by EastEnders producer Julia Smith, who asked her to audition for the role of Cindy Beale, who was to feature in 11 episodes of the soap. The manipulative, reckless nature of her character was a hit with viewers so her contract was extended and the character became a major villain in the series. Cindy was the unfaithful wife of EastEnders stalwart Ian Beale (Adam Woodyatt), between 1988 and 1998. During breaks from EastEnders she filmed the drama Real Women for the BBC, with Pauline Quirke and Frances Barber. On 14 November 2014, Collins reprised the role of Cindy for a short stint for Children in Need.

After EastEnders
After leaving EastEnders in 1998 (when her character met an untimely demise offscreen), her career flourished with a series of drama roles. These include: two series of Real Women (BBC One); two series of Sunburn (BBC One), for which Collins sang the theme song (which was a no. 28 hit in the UK Singles Chart in 1999); Daylight Robbery (ITV); The Sleeper (BBC One); Uprising (ITV): three series of Two Thousand Acres of Sky (BBC One): the two-part series Perfect (ITV); Lloyd and the Hill (ITV) and Ella and the Mothers (BBC One). In 2003 Collins played Sarah Barton in Single.

In 2003, Collins filmed the BBC drama Sea of Souls and then went on to star in a film for Granada/Channel 4 called The Illustrated Mum, which told the story of two girls coping with the unpredictable behaviour of their depressed, alcoholic mother. The film, written by Jacqueline Wilson, was based on the children's novel of the same name. It was screened to great acclaim over Christmas 2003 and won an Emmy Award and two BAFTAs.

In 2004, she starred in an episode of  French and Saunders and also starred with fellow EastEnders actor Martin Kemp in the ITV drama Can't Buy Me Love, which was watched by nearly eight million viewers. The programme was inspired by the real-life story of Howard Walmsley, who was jailed for fraud after pretending to win the lottery to keep his wife Donna (played by Collins) from leaving him. Their lives and marriage were subsequently turned upside down by the events that unfolded.
In 2005, Collins starred in the ITV drama The Last Detective and in the BBC drama The Family Man, alongside ex-EastEnder Daniela Denby-Ashe, which aired in March 2006. She starred in the West End musical Daddy Cool, and while working during the night there shot sequences for a cameo in the short film Broken written and directed by Vicki Psarias, which went on to win the several international awards. She also featured in the film Don't Stop Dreaming, released in 2007. She left Daddy Cool in January 2007 to shoot the Doctor Who episode "42".

On 2 July 2007, it was announced that Collins has been cast for the lead role of Karina Faith in new ITV drama series, Rock Rivals, produced by Shed Productions. In 2009, Collins took part in the BBC Wales programme Coming Home about her Welsh family history. On 21 May 2009, it was rumoured that Collins had auditioned to star in US drama Desperate Housewives, but she did join the cast.

In June 2010, it was announced that Collins would make a six-episode guest appearance as a patient's mother in Casualty. In 2010, she also guest-starred in Romeo & Juliet at the Octagon Theatre, Bolton, playing the Nurse. From 7 April-7 May 2011, Collins starred as Sheila Grundy, Fred Dibnah's third wife, in The Demolition Man at Octagon Theatre, Bolton.

Coronation Street

In January 2011, a rumour was posted on Digital Spy that Collins was in talks to join EastEnders main rivalling soap Coronation Street, after she allegedly met with soap's producer and close friend Phil Collinson. Three months later it was confirmed Collins had joined the cast as Stella Price, new landlady of the Rovers Return pub, beating Lisa Maxwell for the role. Her first episode aired on 16 June 2011 and gained a rating of 8.4 million. It was announced on 22 August 2013 Collins had decided to leave Coronation Street. In January 2014, Collins claimed she was "unhappy" over the lack of screen time for her and her character. Collins filmed her final scenes on 19 February 2014, and made her final appearance as Stella on 2 April 2014.

After Coronation Street
Since leaving Coronation Street, Collins has had various guest roles in television dramas: Casualty  as Samantha Kellman (2014), Death in Paradise as Annette Burgess (2015), and Midsomer Murders as Nadine Campbell (2016). In October 2019 Collins appeared in Casualty as Lorna Rowle/Hammond.

In 2016, Collins took part in the ITV reality series Bear Grylls: Mission Survive.2-1

Personal life
Collins has a daughter by ex-partner Fabrizio Tassalini, Maia Rose (born 29 September 1996).

In 2014, Collins revealed that in 1998 – distraught by the end of her relationship with Tassalini and feeling career pressure  – she attempted suicide while filming Sunburn in Cyprus. She took an overdose of sleeping pills but later woke up and asked her costar to take her to the hospital.

After their split, Collins had an amicable relationship with Tassalini, who lived close by, and they raised their daughter together until he died in 2014. In April 2022 Collins announced she was engaged to her partner of 10 years, Mike Davidson. They married in August.

In August 2014, Collins was one of 200 public figures to sign a letter to The Guardian in opposition to Scottish independence in the run-up to September's referendum on that issue.

Collins is involved in charitable causes. She is an ambassador for Oxfam and has visited Brazil, South Africa and Armenia, promoting the need for the basic right to education. She is also an ambassador for Ambitious about Autism and a patron for the Alexandra Wylie Tower Foundation.

Filmography

Film

Television

Guest appearances
Celebrity Stars in Their Eyes (9 October 1999) – Contestant, as Chrissie Hynde
The Paul O'Grady Show (1 December 2004, 30 March 2006, 25 November 2009) – Guest
All Star Family Fortunes (13 September 2008) – Contestant
As Seen on TV (30 July 2009) – Guest
What Do Kids Know? (31 January 2010) – Guest team captain
Loose Women (2010) – Panellist
The Alan Titchmarsh Show (26 October 2010) – Guest
Who Wants to Be a Millionaire? (August 2011) – Contestant with William Roache
Let's Do Lunch with Gino & Mel (30 August 2011, 16 July 2014) – Guest
Celebrity Juice (13 October 2011) – Panellist
The Chase: Celebrity Special (5 November 2011) – Contestant
Paddy's 2011 Show and Telly (29 December 2011) – Contestant with Melanie Sykes
12 Again (7 June 2012) – Guest
Show Me the Telly (26, 29 November 3, 5, 9, 12, 19 December 2013) – Panellist
Catchphrase: Christmas Special (29 December 2013) – Contestant
Weekend (26 April 2014) – Guest
Saturday Kitchen (3 May 2014) – Guest
This Morning (10 July 2015) – Guest
Pointless (28 December 2019) - Contestant
The Weakest Link (30 December 2021) - Contestant
Garraway's good Stuff (19 june 2022) - Guest

Theatre Credits

References

Published works

External links

1962 births
Living people
Actresses from London
People from Hackney Central
English people of Welsh descent
British people of Belgian-Jewish descent
English television actresses
English soap opera actresses
20th-century English actresses
21st-century English actresses
People associated with the Woodcraft Folk
English people of Flemish descent